Hénon may refer to:

 Hénon, Côtes-d'Armor, France
 Michel Hénon (1931–2013), French mathematician
 Hénon map, a chaotic dynamical system introduced by Michel Hénon
 Guy Hénon (1912–?), French field hockey player
 Jacques-Louis Hénon (1802–1872), French republican politician